James Cross (1921–2021) was a British diplomat in Canada who was kidnapped by militants in 1970.

James Cross is also the name of:
 James Albert Cross (1876–1952), lawyer and political figure in Saskatchewan, Canada
 James B. Cross (1819–1876), American lawyer and politician
 James Robert Cross (born 1930), Australian rugby union player
 James U. Cross (1925–2015), United States Air Force brigadier general and author
 James Cross (cricketer) (1862–1927), English cricketer
 James E. Cross (1840–1917), American soldier and Medal of Honor recipient
 Jim Cross (born 1957), Canadian former professional ice hockey player
 Jim Cross (ice hockey coach) (c. 1937–2020), American ice hockey coach
 Jim Cross, a character in The Reluctant Fundamentalist
 "James Cross", pseudonym of Hugh Jones Parry (1916–1997), British-born American writer